"Disneyland with the Death Penalty" is a 4,500-word article about Singapore written by William Gibson. His first major piece of non-fiction, it was first published as the cover story for Wired magazine's September/October 1993 issue (1.4).

The article follows Gibson's observations of the architecture, phenomenology and culture of Singapore, and the clean, bland and conformist impression the city-state conveys during his stay. Its title and central metaphor—Singapore as Disneyland with the death penalty—is a reference to the authoritarian artifice the author perceives the city-state to be. Singapore, Gibson details, is lacking any sense of creativity or authenticity, absent of any indication of its history or underground culture. He finds the government to be pervasive, corporatist and technocratic, and the judicial system rigid and draconian. Singaporeans are characterized as consumerists of insipid taste. The article is accentuated by local news reports of criminal trials by which the author illustrates his observations, and bracketed by contrasting descriptions of the Southeast Asian airports he arrives and leaves by.

Though Gibson's first major piece of non-fiction, the article had an immediate and lasting impact. The Singaporean government banned Wired upon the publication of the issue. The phrase "Disneyland with the death penalty" came to stand internationally for an authoritarian and austere reputation that the city-state found difficult to shake off.

Synopsis 

The title "Disneyland with the Death Penalty" refers to the subject of the article, the Southeast Asian city-state of Singapore, whose strictly guarded sterility Gibson describes with horror. After opening the article with the Disneyland metaphor, Gibson cites an observation attributed to Laurie Anderson that virtual reality "would never look real until they learned how to put some dirt in it" in relation to the immaculate state of the Changi Airtropolis,  Singapore's international airport. Beyond the airport, he notes that the natural environment has been cultivated into "all-too-perfect examples of itself", such as with the abundance of golf courses. Singaporean society is a "relentlessly G-rated experience", controlled by a government akin to a megacorporation, fixated on conformity and behavioural constraint and with a marked lack of humour and creativity.

Gibson finds it painful to try to connect with the Victorian Singapore, of which few vestiges remained. In an attempt to uncover Singapore's underlying social mechanisms, the author searches fruitlessly for an urban underbelly, rising at dawn for jetlagged walks on several mornings only to discover that the city-state's "physical past ... has almost entirely vanished". He gives an overview of the history of Singapore from the founding of modern Singapore by Sir Stamford Raffles in 1819 to the Japanese occupation and the establishment of the Republic in 1965. He concludes that modern Singapore, effectively a one-party state and capitalist technocracy, is a product first and foremost of the vision of three-decade Prime Minister Lee Kuan Yew. As an aside, he quotes a headline from the South China Morning Post detailing the trial of a cadre of economists, a government official (current Senior Minister, Tharman) and a newspaper editor for divulging a state secret by revealing the Singaporean economic growth rate.

Gibson deplores the absence of an authentic metropolitan feeling, something which he blames for the "telling lack of creativity". He gives a psychogeographic account of the architecture of the city-state, noting the endless parade of young, attractive and generically attired middle class through the host of shopping centers, and comparing the city-state to the convention district of Atlanta, Georgia. He finds the selection in music stores and bookshops unrelentingly bland, musing whether this is partially attributable to the efforts of the Undesirable Propagation Unit (UPU), one of several state censorship agencies. Amidst the near-total absence of bohemianism and counterculture, Gibson finds no trace of dissidence, an underground, or slums. In the place of a sex trade, the author finds government-sanctioned "health centers" – in fact massage parlours – and mandatory dating organized and enforced by government agencies. "[T]here is remarkably little", he writes of the city-state "that is not the result of deliberate and no doubt carefully deliberated social policy."

The creative deficit of the city-state is evident to the author also in the Singaporeans' obsession with consumerism as a pastime, the homogeneity of the retailers and their fare, and in what he characterizes as their other passion: dining (although he finds fault with the diversity of the food, it is, he remarks "something to write home about"). He returns then to the theme of the staid insipidity of the city-state, observing the unsettling cleanliness of the physical environment and the self-policing of the populace. In detailing Singaporean technological advancement and aspirations as an information economy, Gibson casts doubt on the resilience of their controlled and conservative nature in the face of impending mass exposure to digital culture –  "the wilds of X-rated cyberspace". "Perhaps", he speculates, "Singapore's destiny will be to become nothing more than a smug, neo-Swiss enclave of order and prosperity, amid a sea of unthinkable ... weirdness."

He expresses reservations about the justice of capital punishment and describes the Singaporeans as the true bearers of zero tolerance. After hearing the announcement of van Damme's sentencing, Gibson decides to leave, checks out "in record time" from the hotel, and catches a cab to the airport. The trip is conspicuous for the absence of police along the road, but there is an abundance of them at the Changi Airtropolis, where Gibson photographs a discarded piece of crumpled paper, incurring their ire. Flying into Hong Kong he briefly glimpses the soon-to-be-destroyed shantytown Kowloon Walled City at the end of one of the runways at the chaotic Kai Tak Airport, and muses about the contrast with the staid and sanitized city-state he has left behind. The essay ends with the declaration "I loosened my tie, clearing Singapore airspace."

Impact and legacy

The Singapore government responded to the publication of the article by banning Wired from the country. The phrase "Disneyland with the death penalty" became a famous and widely referenced description for the nation, adopted in particular by opponents of Singapore's perceived authoritarian nature. The city-state's authoritarian and austere reputation made it difficult to shake the description off; Creative Review hailed it as "famously damning", while The New York Times associate editor R. W. Apple Jr. defended the city-state in a 2003 piece as "hardly deserving of William Gibson's woundingly dismissive tag line".

Reviewing the work in a 2003 blog post, Gibson wrote:

 In 2009, John Kampfner observed that the phrase "Disneyland with the death penalty" was still being "cited by detractors of Singapore as a good summary of its human rights record and by supporters of the country as an example of foreign high-handedness." "Disneyland with the Death Penalty" was assigned as reading on the topic of "Singaporean progress" for a 2008 National University of Singapore Writing & Critical Thinking course. The piece was included in a 2012 compilation of Gibson's non-fiction writing, Distrust That Particular Flavor.

Critical reception 
The article provoked a strong critical reaction. The Boston Globe characterized it as a "biting piece on the technocratic state in Singapore". It was recommended by postmodern political geographer Edward Soja as "a wonderful tour of the cyberspatial urbanities" of the city-state. Journalist Steven Poole called it a "horrified report", and argued that it showed that the author "despises the seamless, strictured planes of corporate big business" and is "the champion of the interstitial". In a review of Gibson's 2010 novel Zero History for The Observer James Purdon identified "Disneyland" as one of the high points of Gibson's career, "a witty, perceptive piece of reportage, hinting at a non-fiction talent equal to the vision that had elevated Gibson to digital-age guru".

Philosopher and technology writer Peter Ludlow interpreted the piece as an attack on the city, and noted as ironic the fact that the real Disneyland was in California—a state whose "repressive penal code includes the death penalty". Urban theorist Maarten Delbeke noted that Gibson cited the computerized control of the city-state as responsible for its sanitized inauthentic character, a claim Delbeke called "a conventional, almost old-fashioned complaint against technocracy". In a 2004 article in Forum on Contemporary Art & Society, Paul Rae commented that "[w]hile an ability to capture the zeitgeist is to be taken seriously in a context such as this one, Gibson's journalistic reportage is inevitably unrefined", and cited the accusation of Singapore-based British academic John Phillips that Gibson "fails to really think [his critiques] through".

In S,M,L,XL (1995), urbanist and architectural theorist Rem Koolhaas took issue with the acerbic, ironic tone of the article, condemning it as a typical reaction by "dead parents deploring the mess [their] children have made of their inheritance". Koolhaas argued that reactions like Gibson's imply that the positive legacy of modernity can only be intelligently used by Westerners, and that attempts such as Singapore's at embracing the "newness" of modernity without understanding its history would result in a far-reaching and deplorable eradication.

Singaporean Tang Weng Hong in turn wrote a critical response to both Gibson and Koolhaas.

See also 

Technocracy
Asian values
Commodity fetishism
Paternalism
Postmodernity
Simulacra and Simulation
Urban planning in Singapore

References

External links 

"Disneyland with the Death Penalty" at Wired.com

Opinion journalism
Singaporean culture
Society of Singapore
Travel writing
Works by William Gibson
Wired (magazine) articles
1993 documents